Pio Duran, officially the Municipality of Pio Duran, is a 3rd class municipality in the province of Albay, Philippines. According to the 2020 census, it has a population of 49,070 people.

Access to the town is via Ligao. It is considered one of the major route going to Masbate.

It was named after the Filipino Pan-Asianist, Lawyer and Legislator, Pio Saceda Duran (1900–1961).

Geography

According to the Philippine Statistics Authority, the municipality has a land area of  constituting  of the  total area of Albay.

Barangays
Pio Duran is politically subdivided into 33 barangays.

Climate

Demographics

In the 2020 census, Pio Duran had a population of 49,070.

Economy

Notable personalities

Jona Viray

References

External links
 [ Philippine Standard Geographic Code]

Municipalities of Albay